Rinzia affinis is a plant species of the family Myrtaceae endemic to Western Australia.

It blooms between July and November producing white-pink flowers.

It is found on hills in the southern Wheatbelt and the Great Southern region of Western Australia between Corrigin and Jerramungup where it grows in sandy soils over laterite.

References

affinis
Endemic flora of Western Australia
Myrtales of Australia
Rosids of Western Australia
Vulnerable flora of Australia
Plants described in 1986